Chak No. 670/11 G.B. is a village located in Pakistan, approximately  from Pir Mahal.

Geography and climate

In 2006, the village, as well as the whole province of Punjab, experienced one of the coldest winters in the last 70 years.

References

External links
Pir Mahal Weather
Pir Mahal Weather
Location of Pir Mahal - Falling Rain Genomics

Populated places in Toba Tek Singh District